Robert Elyot was Bishop of Waterford from 1349 to 1350; and then of Killala from 1351 to 1383. He was appointed 8 June 1351 but deprived by Antipope Clement VII before 17 January 1383; he died before January 1390.

References

1390 deaths
14th-century Roman Catholic bishops in Ireland
Bishops of Killala
Religious leaders from County Mayo
Year of birth unknown